The  is a divine creature with human torso and birdlike head in Japanese mythology.

The name is a transliteration of garuda, a race of enormously gigantic birds in Hinduism. the Japanese Buddhist version is based upon Hindu Mythology.

The karura is said to be enormous, fire-breathing, and to feed on dragons/serpents, just as Garuda is the bane of Nāgas. Only a dragon who possesses a Buddhist talisman, or one who has converted to the Buddhist teaching, can escape unharmed from the Karura. Shumisen or Mount Meru is said to be its habitat.

One famous example is the Karura statue at Kōfuku-ji, Nara, amongst the eight deva statues presented at the Buddhābhiṣeka dated to the year Tenpyō 6 or 734, pictured top right). This karura is depicted as wearing Tang Chinese-style armor, and thus is seen wingless.

But more conventionally, the Karura is depicted as a winged being with human torso and avian head, as in the Vajra Hall section of the Womb Realm mandala and other iconographic books and scrolls.

In fine art

The karura (garuda) mask is one of the stock character masks worn by performers of the ancient Japanese courtly dance art of gigaku.

The flaming nimbus or halo is known by the name "karura flame" and typically seen adorning behind the statue of the ).

The karura is also said to be the prototype of the depictions of the tengu or karasutengu.

In popular culture
The Pokémon evolutionary line of Magby, Magmar, and Magmortar are based on the karura.

See also 
 
 Avalerion
 Garuda
 Kalaviṅka
 Kinnara
 List of avian humanoids
 List of Zatch Bell! characters
 Tengu
 Utawarerumono

References

External links

Buddhist gods
Birds in Buddhism
Japanese legendary creatures
Mythological birds of prey
Avian humanoids